Purvis McDougall (3 August 1935 – 9 September 2001) was a Canadian bobsledder. He competed in the two-man and the four-man events at the 1968 Winter Olympics.

References

1935 births
2001 deaths
Canadian male bobsledders
Olympic bobsledders of Canada
Bobsledders at the 1968 Winter Olympics
Sportspeople from Montreal